Carrots and Sticks (stylized as CARROTS and STiCKS) is the fifth album by Japanese idol group Bish released through Avex Trax on July 3, 2019. The album was released in three parts: Sticks (stylized as STiCKS, an EP) on April 3, Carrots (stylized as CARROTS, also an EP) on May 3, and the full version on July 3. The two EPs contained four songs each, while the full version contained an additional six songs for a combined fourteen songs.

History
The album was first announced on April 1, 2019, during Bish's theater screening of Bring Icing Shit Horse Tour Final "The Nude", a film documenting the group's concert "Bring Icing Shit Horse Tour" at Makuhari Messe in December 2018. On the same day, a video detailing the release schedule of the album accompanied by a song in the album, "Tsuinishi", was released on YouTube. In the video, producer Kenta Matsukuma described Sticks as containing songs that were "dirty, can't sell, and noisy", while Carrots would contain "sellable, cool" songs. The EPs were distributed exclusively through Apple Music.

On June 12, Bish "released" the entire album through Tower Records 21 days before the official release date, a stunt also pulled for the previous album, The Guerrilla Bish. However, it was soon revealed that the album was a fake: all fourteen songs were performed by producers Kenta Matsukuma and JxSxK under the name "Beat Mint Boyz". The real version was released on Apple Music the following day. Nevertheless, the fake album managed to climb to 6th place on the Oricon weekly charts.

Release timeline
 April 2: "Tsuinishi" released on YouTube
 April 3: Sticks, an EP containing four songs, released on Apple Music
 May 2: "I Am Me" released on YouTube
 May 3: Carrots, another EP containing four songs, released on Apple Music
 June 11: "Distance" broadcast on Tokyo FM's program, "School of Lock!"
 June 12: "Distance" released on YouTube; fake version sold at Tower Records
 June 13: Full album pre-released on Apple Music
 July 3: Official release of full album

Track listing

Charts

References

2019 albums
BiSH albums